USS Clinton (APA/LPA-144) was a Haskell-class attack transport in service with the United States Navy from 1945 to 1946. She was sunk as a target in 1984.

History 
Clinton was launched 29 November 1944 by California Shipbuilding Co., Wilmington, California, under a Maritime Commission contract; sponsored by Mrs. L. N. Green; transferred to the Navy 1 February 1945; converted at U.S. Naval Station, Astoria, Oregon; and commissioned 1 February 1945.

Clinton cleared San Francisco, California, 17 April 1945 and sailed to land Marine replacement troops and equipment on Okinawa between 27 and 31 May. She transferred battle casualties to Guam where she embarked ground forces of the 7th Bomber Command for transportation to Okinawa, arriving 2 July. When she sailed 6 days later she was carrying over 1,000 Okinawan and Korean prisoners of war for internment in the Hawaiian Islands. Clinton cleared Honolulu 5 August carrying replacement troops to Saipan.

She sailed on to Manila to embark Army occupation troops whom she landed at Tsingtao, China, 11 October 1945. Arriving at Haiphong, French Indo-China, 26 October, she loaded Chinese troops and equipment and carried them to Chinwangtao and Taku for the reoccupation of northern China. Based on an anecdotal description of one of its crew members, the ship may have also been assigned to transport troops to Yokohama to assist in the post-war occupation there. Assigned to "Operation Magic Carpet" duty, Clinton embarked homeward-bound servicemen at Manila and sailed 28 November for San Francisco, California, arriving 18 December. She continued to the U.S. East Coast, arriving at Norfolk, Virginia, 2 February 1946.

Decommissioning and fate
Clinton was decommissioned 2 May 1946 and transferred to the Maritime Commission for disposal 1 October 1958. She was redesignated as an Amphibious Transport (LPA-144) on 1 January 1969. Withdrawn from the National Defense Reserve Fleet, 9 November 1983, the ex-Clinton was sunk as a fleet exercise target off the Virginia Capes, 1 August 1984.

Awards 
Clinton received one battle star for World War II service.

References

External links 

 NavSource Online: Amphibious Photo Archive - USS Clinton (APA/LPA-144)

Victory ships
Ships built in Los Angeles
Haskell-class attack transports
Clinton County, Illinois
Clinton County, Indiana
Clinton County, Iowa
Clinton County, Kentucky
Clinton County, Michigan
Clinton County, Missouri
Clinton County, New York
Clinton County, Ohio
Clinton County, Pennsylvania
World War II amphibious warfare vessels of the United States
1944 ships